The Chevening Scholarship is an international scholarship, funded by the British Foreign and Commonwealth Office, that lets foreign students with leadership qualities study at universities in the United Kingdom.

History
The Chevening Scholarships Programme commenced in 1983 as the Foreign and Commonwealth Office Awards Scheme (FCOAS) and is funded by the British government's Foreign and Commonwealth Office and its partner organisations. The stated objective of the scheme is to build a network of friends of the UK, who will be future leaders in their countries. In 1994, the name of the scheme was changed to Chevening, after Chevening House in Sevenoaks, Kentcurrently the joint official residence of the British Foreign Secretary and the British Deputy Prime Minister.

A companion Chevening Fellowships Scheme was launched by the Foreign and Commonwealth Office in 2004. The Fellowships programme provides places for mid-career professionals already in positions of leadership and influence to undertake 3-month courses in fields related to the FCDO's policy goals.

In 2007–08 the Chevening Scholarships cost the British Foreign and Commonwealth Office approximately £22 million. In the same year the Chevening Fellowships scheme cost approximately £4 million.  In July 2010 the British Foreign Minister announced a cut of £10 million from the scholarships budget, in the context of wider budget cuts.  This resulted in a number of scholarships being cancelled for 2010–11.  After a review period, the 2011–12 scholarship round opened for applications in February 2011.  In 2011–12 the number of scholarships was increased to more than 700 worldwide. In 2015/16 the number of scholarships was increased to 1,500. In 2017/18, the total number of scholarships was 1,650.

In April 2012, the Association of Commonwealth Universities took over running of the scheme from the British Council, establishing a Chevening Secretariat.

In October 2018, the Chevening Scholarships Programme celebrated its 35th anniversary by awarding a total number of 1,800 scholarships from 160 countries for the 2018/19 school year. Earlier that year, the number of Chevening alumni also hit the 50,000 mark.

Participating countries

The number of available scholarships varies from country to country. More than thirty scholarships are currently awarded to candidates from Nepal, India, Russia and China. Twenty or more are awarded to candidates from Egypt, South Korea, Indonesia, Bhutan, Pakistan, Mexico, Thailand and Brazil, with less than five core scholarships now available to candidates from Australia and Canada (US students are not eligible, but can apply for the Marshall Scholarships which are also funded by the Foreign and Commonwealth Office). The Chevening Scholarship is not available to non-indigenous Australian candidates. Chevening scholarship is considered one of the top scholarships for master's degree courses. The selection criteria of Chevening scholarship is a holistic process where applicants have to write strong motivational letters and show personal and academic achievements.

The significance of the Chevening scholarship scheme rests on its large scopein 2017/18 1650 scholarships were awarded to students from more than 140 countries, allowing students from developing countries to access British tertiary education institutions, some of which are of a very high standard as determined by international rankings. In this way the Chevening scheme is more similar to the US Fulbright Scholarships which bring students from 140 countries to the US and differs from the Rhodes Scholarship scheme which currently allows applications from approximately 18 countries. Winners of Chevening scholarships often receive coverage in national and local newspapers.

Selection criteria 
The selection criteria for Chevening Scholarship are aimed to identify "high-calibre graduates with the personal, intellectual and interpersonal qualities necessary for leadership."  Specific selection criteria for Chevening Scholarships vary from country to country, and from year to year.  In 2017/18, of 65,000 applicants, 1650 scholarships were awarded.

Applications are made online via a web portal between early August and early November of each year, except for some sponsored scholarships for which applicants apply via the co-sponsoring organisation. Applications for 2018/19 opened on 6 August 2018 and closed on 6 November 2018 at 5pm BST. Scholarship applicants must also apply directly to their preferred universities in the UK, usually for taught master's degree courses. Most scholarships include a living stipend, airfares and the full or partial cost of tuition fees.

The most popular destinations for study in 2011 were the  London School of Economics & Political Science, University College London, and the Universities of Oxford, Cambridge, Edinburgh, University of Nottingham, University of Bath and King's College London.

Chevening alumni

As of 2017/18, there are an estimated 50,000 Chevening Scholarship alumni, with an emphasis being placed on improved links with and between previous scholars as a consequence of reviews in 2005 and 2006. Many Chevening Scholars have since gone on to reach positions of influence in a range of sectors.

Notable alumni include:
Abdul Hamid Bador - Inspector-General of Police, the Royal Malaysian Police (since May 2019)
 A.T.M. Zahirul Alam – Force Commander of the United Nations Mission in Liberia
 Ahmad Fuadi – Indonesian writer, novelist and social entrepreneur
 Álvaro Uribe – President of Colombia (2002–2010)
 Amina C. Mohamed – Cabinet Secretary for Foreign Affairs of Kenya
 Amitabh Kant – CEO, NITI Aayog (National Institution for Transforming India)
 Anand Ramlogan – Attorney General of Trinidad and Tobago
 Anna Jóelsdóttir – artist
 Annastacia Palaszczuk – Premier of the Australian state of Queensland
 Anne Enright – Booker Prize–winning author
 Anote Tong – President of Kiribati
 Baldwin Spencer – Prime Minister of Antigua and Barbuda
 Binyavanga Wainaina – Caine Prize–winning novelist
 Bolaji Abdullahi – Nigerian Politician and writer
 Bogolo Kenewendo – Cabinet Minister of Investment, Trade and Industry, in the Cabinet of Botswana 
 Carlos Alvarado Quesada – President of Costa Rica
 Chen Liangyu – member of the Politburo of the Communist Party of China
 Emil Kirjas – Macedoniann politician
Erdem Moralıoğlu – Fashion designer
  - State Secretary for Budget and Consumer Affairs of Belgium
 Fawad Hasan Fawad, former Principal Secretary to the Prime Minister of Pakistan
 Filiz Ali – pianist
 Ghil'ad Zuckermann – linguist and revivalist
 Gideon Olanrewaju - Nigerian educational development practitioner 
 Giga Bokeria – Secretary of the National Security Council, Georgia
 Guðni Th. Jóhannesson – President of Iceland
 Guillermo Sheridan – literary critic
 Hassan Wario – Kenyan Cabinet Minister
 Helon Habila – Caine Prize–winning novelist
 Herbert Wigwe – CEO, Access Bank, Nigeria
 Ibrahim Sheme – Nigerian writer and journalist
 Igor Pokaz – Croatian Ambassador to NATO
 Jaime Bermudez – Minister of Foreign Affairs, Colombia
 João Miranda – former Minister for Foreign Affairs, Angola
 John Momoh – Chairman, Channels Television, Nigeria
 Jorge Capitanich – former Chief of the Cabinet of Ministers of Argentina
 Jorma Ollila – Non-Executive Chairman of Royal Dutch Shell; Non-Executive Chairman of Nokia
 Katlego Kai Kolanyane-Kesupile – Botswanan performance artist and LGBT activist 
 Mahnaz Malik – Barrister and arbitrator between the United Kingdom and Pakistan
 Manuel Lajo – Member of the Peruvian Congress
 Marek Belka – former Prime Minister of Poland; currently Head of the National Bank of Poland
 Martín Lousteau – Argentine Congressman and former Minister of Economy
 Martin Manurung – Member of the Indonesian People's Representative Council
Mélanie Joly – Canadian Cabinet Minister
 Muhammad Uteem – Member of the National Assembly of Mauritius
 Nan Achnas – Film Director
 Nkoyo Esu Toyo - Nigerian Politician and Diplomat
 Paula Vaccaro - Argentine/Italian Award-winning Journalist, Producer and Scriptwriter also known as Paula Alvarez Vaccaro
 Peter Sinon – Seychellois Cabinet Minister
 Phil Goff – New Zealand Mayor of Auckland
Pooja Kapur – Indian Ambassador to the Republic of Bulgaria and the Republic of North Macedonia.
 Prince Seeiso of Lesotho – diplomat 
 Pritam Singh – Singaporean Opposition Leader
 Rajesh Talwar – Indian writer
 Riri Riza – Indonesian film director, film producer and screenwriter
 Sergei Stanishev – former Prime Minister of Bulgaria; currently President of the Party of European Socialists
 Shaffi Mather – Former Chief Economic Advisor to the Chief Minister of Kerala, India
 Shirani Bandaranayake – Chief Justice of Sri Lanka
 Sigmundur Davíð Gunnlaugsson – Former Prime Minister of Iceland
 Simon Kolawole – Founder, Cable Newspaper Limited, Nigeria
 Stone Sizani – Member of the South African National Assembly and ANC Chief Whip
 T. V. Narendran – CEO & Managing Director, Tata Steel
Xiaolu Guo, Chinese novelist and film director
 Zaina Erhaim – Syrian journalist
 Ziad Bahaa-Eldin – Deputy Prime Minister of Egypt

See also
 Rhodes Scholarship
 Jardine Scholarship
 Yenching Scholarship
 Fulbright Program

References

External links
 .

Scholarships in the United Kingdom
Government scholarships